Elk State Park is a  Pennsylvania state park in Jones Township, Elk County and Sergeant Township, McKean County, Pennsylvania, in the United States. East Branch Clarion River Lake is a man-made lake covering  within the park. The lake and streams in the park are stocked with cold and warm water fish.

Recreation

East Branch Clarion River Lake 
East Branch Clarion River Lake was constructed by the U.S. Army Corps of Engineers by damming the East Branch of the Clarion River. Construction of the rolled earth, impervious core dam  was authorized by the Flood Control Act of 1944. The lake is one of sixteen flood control projects administered by the Pittsburgh District of the Army Corps of Engineers. East Branch Clarion River Lake helps to provide flood protection for the Clarion River valley and the lower portions of the Allegheny River and the upper portions of the Ohio River.

It was constructed in 1952 for $9 million and serves a  drainage area. It is estimated that East Branch Clarion River Lake has prevented $81 million in damage. The dam was especially important in curtailing damage during the 1972 floods caused by Hurricane Agnes.

East Branch Clarion River Lake also serves recreational purposes. Controlled releases of water during the dry summer months help to improve water quality and quantity for industrial and domestic uses. These releases of the lake waters also improve navigation on the rivers and enhance aquatic life.

East Branch Clarion River Lake is a destination for both fisherman and recreational boaters. The lake is home to cold water fishing for walleye, smallmouth bass, muskellunge, brook, lake, rainbow and brown trout. The creeks of the park are stocked by the Pennsylvania Fish and Boat Commission. There is a native brook trout population in some of the smaller streams of the park. There is no limit on the power of the boats. All boats are required to have current registration with any state. Ice fishing and ice boating are common winter activities on East Branch Clarion River Lake.

Hunting
Hunters are expected to follow the rules and regulations of the Pennsylvania Game Commission. The common game species are black bears, squirrels, white-tailed deer, and turkeys. The hunting of groundhogs is prohibited. Hunters also use the park to gain access to the nearby State Game Lands and Elk State Forest.

Nearby state parks
The following state parks are within  of Elk State Park:
Bendigo State Park (Elk County)
Bucktail State Park Natural Area (Cameron County and Clinton Counties)
Kinzua Bridge State Park (McKean County)
Parker Dam State Park (Clearfield County)
Sinnemahoning State Park (Cameron  and Potter Counties)
Sizerville State Park (Cameron and Potter Counties)

References

External links

  

State parks of Pennsylvania
United States Army Corps of Engineers
Protected areas established in 1963
Parks in Elk County, Pennsylvania
Parks in McKean County, Pennsylvania
1963 establishments in Pennsylvania
Protected areas of Elk County, Pennsylvania
Protected areas of McKean County, Pennsylvania